Costifer is a family of sea sponges. It is the only genus in the monotypic family Isoraphiniidae.

Species 
 Costifer vasiformis Wilson, 1925
 Costifer wilsoni Lévi, 1993

References
 

Tetractinellida